Bryan Barnett (born 10 February 1987) is a Canadian sprinter who specializes in the 200 metres. He took up bobsleigh in 2013 and represented Canada at the 2014 Sochi Olympics.

Career

Athletics
Barnett won the silver medal in the 200m event at the 2006 World Junior Championships, and also competed at the 2007, 2009, and 2011 World Championships in Athletics, as well as the 2008 Olympic Games without reaching the final. For his silver medal performance at the 2006 World Junior Championships, he was named the 2006 Outstanding Junior Athlete of the Year by Athletics Canada. At the 2007 Pan American Games he won a silver medal in the 4 x 100 metres relay, together with teammates Richard Adu-Bobie, Anson Henry and Jared Connaughton.

Bryan currently trains in Edmonton with the Q-School training group under coach Quin Sekulich, coach of a number of high performance athletes.

Bobsled
Barnett took up bobsled in 2013 after thinking that his sprinting abilities would make him a good fit for the sport. He is one of the few athletes who have competed in both the Summer and Winter Olympic games, after competing at the 2014 Winter Olympics in the two-man and four-man bobsled events, finishing 6th in the two-man with teammate Justin Kripps, and 13th in the four-man with teammates Christopher Spring, James McNaughton, and Timothy Randall.

Personal life
Barnett was born in Edmonton, Alberta to father Dassel Barnett, and mother Pamela Barnett.

Statistics

Personal bests

References

External links
 
 Profile at Athletics Canada

1987 births
Living people
Athletes from Edmonton
Athletes (track and field) at the 2007 Pan American Games
Athletes (track and field) at the 2008 Summer Olympics
Athletes (track and field) at the 2010 Commonwealth Games
Bobsledders at the 2014 Winter Olympics
Bobsledders at the 2018 Winter Olympics
Black Canadian track and field athletes
Canadian male sprinters
Olympic track and field athletes of Canada
Canadian male bobsledders
Olympic bobsledders of Canada
Commonwealth Games competitors for Canada
Pan American Games silver medalists for Canada
Pan American Games medalists in athletics (track and field)
Medalists at the 2007 Pan American Games